The Hurricane, or Hurricane Turn, is a passenger train operated by the Alaska Railroad between Talkeetna and Hurricane Gulch in Alaska. This train is unique in that rather than making scheduled station stops, it is a flag stop train meaning that passengers between Talkeetna and Hurricane can wave a white cloth anywhere along the route and the train will stop to pick them up. The train runs daily Thursday through Sunday between the months of May and September and the first Thursday of every month the rest of the year (between Hurricane Gulch and Anchorage). The Hurricane Turn is one of the last true flag-stop trains in the United States.

By 2009, the Budd Rail Diesel Cars were removed from service on the Hurricane Turn. Current configuration is two locomotives, two passenger cars and one baggage car. In 2020, summer services began in July in response to the COVID-19 pandemic.

References

External links 

Transportation in Matanuska-Susitna Borough, Alaska
Passenger trains of the Alaska Railroad
Passenger rail transportation in Alaska
Named passenger trains of the United States